Allocota cyanipennis is a species of either bluish-red or violet-red coloured ground beetle in the Lebiinae subfamily that can be found in such Asian countries as Philippines and Indonesian island of Sulawesi.

References

Beetles described in 1923
Beetles of Asia